Nela is a Croatian, Czech and Slovak feminine given name that serves as a diminutive form of Antonela and Antonie in Croatia, Czech Republic and Slovakia. It is also a Danish, German, Norwegian and Swedish given name that serves as a short form of Cornelia in Denmark, Greenland, Sweden, Norway, Germany, Austria, Namibia, and parts of Switzerland, Hungary and Romania. It is also a surname. Notable people with this name include the following:

Given name
Nela Álvarez (1919–2009), Filipina actress 
Nela Arias-Misson (1915–2015), Cuban painter and sculptor
Nela Eržišnik (1924–2007), Croatian actress
Nela Hasanbegović (born 1984), Bosnian sculptor
Nela Kuburović (born 1982), Serbian politician
Nela Martínez (1912–2004), Ecuadorian activist
Nela Navarro, American professor
Nela Pocisková (born 1990), Slovak singer and actress
Nela Vidakovic (born 1981), Serbian singer
Nela Zisser (born 1992), New Zealand model

Surname
Havzi Nela (1934–1988), Albanian dissident poet
Sebastiano Nela (born 1961), Italian footballer

See also

Nana (disambiguation)
Nea (given name)
Neda (disambiguation), given name and surname
Nel (name)
Nelas, Portuguese municipality
Nella, given name
Nen (disambiguation)
Nena (given name)
NEPA (disambiguation)
Nesa (disambiguation)
Neva (name) 
Nina (disambiguation)
Nola (name)
Nuna (disambiguation)

Notes

Croatian feminine given names
Czech feminine given names
Danish feminine given names
German feminine given names
Norwegian feminine given names
Slovak feminine given names
Swedish feminine given names